Week Ends Only is a 1932 American pre-Code film directed by Alan Crosland and starring Joan Bennett, Ben Lyon and John Halliday. It was made by Fox Film Corporation. The screenplay was written by William M. Conselman and Samuel Hopkins Adams, based on novel by Samuel Hopkins Adams.

Cast
 Joan Bennett as Venetia Carr
 Ben Lyon as Jack Williams
 John Halliday as Arthur Ladden
 Halliwell Hobbes as Martin
 Walter Byron as Jimmy Brigg
 Henry Armetta as Washroom Attendant
 John Arledge as Ted Lane

References

External links

 
Week Ends Only at Allmovie

American black-and-white films
1932 romantic drama films
Films directed by Alan Crosland
1932 films
Fox Film films
American romantic drama films
1930s American films
Silent romantic drama films